René Reynaldo Harris (11 November 1947 – 5 July 2008) was President of the Republic of Nauru four times between 1999 and 2004. He was a Member of Parliament from 1977 to 2008.

Background and early career
Rene Reynaldo Harris was born on 11 November 1947 in Aiwo, Nauru.

He obtained his secondary education from Geelong College in Victoria, Australia. Prior to his election to parliament, Harris worked for the Nauru Phosphate Corporation (NPC) and was the Manager of the Nauru Pacific Line.

He was first elected as an MP for Aiwo in 1977 as a replacement for Samuel Tsitsi. His first term lasted only seven days as he had to resign following a court conviction for assault. However, he won the resultant by-election with a convincing majority. Harris was elected Deputy Speaker of the Parliament in 1978. He resigned his seat in 1981, but was re-elected in the subsequent by-election five days later. and Speaker of the Parliament in December 1986. In 1992 he was appointed Chairman of the Board of Directors of the NPC.

In 1998, Harris was convicted of assault and jail-breaking by forcibly freeing three of his relatives from the Nauru Police lock-up with the help of two accomplices. The Australian Broadcasting Corporation television program "Foreign Correspondent" also claimed that as Chairman of the NPC, Harris spent more than A$231,000 on luxury items, holidays and a property in Melbourne. Harris maintained a luxury penthouse suite on the 51st floor of Nauru House in Melbourne.

Presidential terms of office

Harris first became president on 27 April 1999 and remained in that post until 20 April 2000 when he was replaced by Bernard Dowiyogo, who retained that office until Harris resumed the presidency on 29 March 2001 following a vote of no-confidence in Dowiyogo. The situation assumed farcical proportions in January 2003, when both men held the office twice. Dowiyogo eventually retained the presidency, although his death in March 2003 prompted another round of uncertainty. Harris was finally reelected President on 15 August 2003.

Harris was quoted as saying he was re-elected by the nation's parliament because the MPs "didn't see the light" with his predecessor, Ludwig Scotty. Harris broke the Nauruan government's deadlock when he was able to pass legislation through parliament in 2003.

His government was responsible for the housing of Australian asylum seekers on the island and also Nauru's admission to the United Nations and full membership in the Commonwealth of Nations. Mr. Harris was criticized by the Nauruan opposition party (Naoero Amo) and the international community for corruption and violations of human rights.

Harris received monthly kidney dialysis treatment for his diabetes in Melbourne. His health was a major concern for at least the last 5 years of his life because diabetes ended the life of one of his political opponents, Bernard Dowiyogo, at the age of 57 in early 2003. In December 2003, Harris collapsed in Nauru's parliament building and was revived by Dr. Kieren Keke.

On 22 June 2004, due to a political defection, he was ousted as president, and Ludwig Scotty succeeded him.

Post-Presidency and controversies

In parliamentary elections later in 2004, Scotty's supporters won a majority of the seats and Harris made no further attempts to be reelected president. In the parliamentary election held on 25 August 2007, Harris was the only opposition member of parliament to be re-elected; Scotty's supporters won an even larger victory and it was believed that Harris might have no political supporters in Parliament.

After Nauru's main police station was burned on 7 March 2008 by protesters in Harris' Aiwo constituency who were upset by phosphate dust, the government accused Harris of instigating the protesters.

Harris's periods as President of Nauru were sometimes owing to his alliance with the influential Kinza Clodumar, himself a former president, but also exercising considerable negotiating weight in the Parliament of Nauru.

April 2008 election and loss of parliamentary seat

In the parliamentary election held on 26 April 2008, Harris stood again but lost his seat; supporters of President Marcus Stephen won a majority. After 31 years in Parliament, this was the first time he lost his seat.

Death
Harris suffered a heart attack on 4 July 2008 and died in Denigomodu as a result on the morning of 5 July. A state funeral was held for him later on the same day. He was aged 60 at the time of his death, and although relatively young, his political generation had been to some extent superseded by a government ministerial team about 20 years younger than him.

References

External links
ABC News: Former Nauru president loses parliamentary seat
Photograph of Nauruan President René Harris (at right) at a meeting with South African President Thabo Mbeki, 4 March 2002.

1948 births
2008 deaths
Members of the Parliament of Nauru
Speakers of the Parliament of Nauru
Presidents of Nauru
People from Aiwo District
Nauruan Congregationalists
People educated at Geelong College
20th-century Nauruan politicians
21st-century Nauruan politicians